The Brahms Museum, in  Mürzzuschlag, in Styria, Austria, is dedicated to the composer Johannes Brahms. He lived here during the summers of 1884 and 1885.

Description
The composer's living quarters were restored in 2015. There is a permanent exhibition about Brahms, particularly his time at Mürzzuschlag. He lived here, over the two years 1884 and 1885, for a total of nine months; during this time he composed his Symphony No. 4, and many songs.

There are items and photographs relating to Brahms, and a grand piano owned by the composer. The exhibition describes the composer's circle of friends, some of whom visited him during his stay.

See also 
 List of music museums
 List of museums in Styria

References

Johannes Brahms
Museums in Styria
Music museums in Austria
Biographical museums in Austria